Arachchige Jayatissa Ranaweera is a Sri Lankan politician, former member of the Parliament of Sri Lanka and a former government minister. Currently he is a Member of the Sabaragamuwa Provincial Council and hold the position of Council Chairman Post

References

Living people
Members of the 10th Parliament of Sri Lanka
Members of the 11th Parliament of Sri Lanka
Members of the 13th Parliament of Sri Lanka
Government ministers of Sri Lanka
Sri Lanka Freedom Party politicians
United People's Freedom Alliance politicians
1956 births